The Greyson Shale is a geologic formation in Montana. It preserves fossils.

See also

 List of fossiliferous stratigraphic units in Montana
 Paleontology in Montana

References

Geologic formations of Montana